Harold Martin (born 5 January 1950) is a former Australian rules footballer who played for Fitzroy in the Victorian Football League (VFL) and coached in the Victorian Football Association.

Martin made only one appearance with the seniors at Fitzroy, with his debut coming in a 52-point loss to Carlton at Princes Park late in the 1968 VFL season. He then embarked on a long career in the VFA and captain-coached Sunshine from 1975 to 1977. As captain-coach of Preston, he took the club to a Grand Final in 1978, where they were beaten by Prahran, with Martin involved in an infamous fist fight with Sam Kekovich. Martin steered Preston to another Grand Final in 1981 but his team against ended the day disappointed. His next appointment was at Coburg, which he coached to third place in 1982. After winning a 'Best and Fairest' with Coburg in 1983, Martin joined Reservoir as coach and steered them to the 1984 division two DVFL premiership. He was coach of Box Hill in 1987 and 1988.

References

Holmesby, Russell and Main, Jim (2007). The Encyclopedia of AFL Footballers. 7th ed. Melbourne: Bas Publishing.

1950 births
Living people
Fitzroy Football Club players
Sunshine Football Club (VFA) players
Sunshine Football Club (VFA) coaches
Preston Football Club (VFA) players
Preston Football Club (VFA) coaches
Coburg Football Club players
Coburg Football Club coaches
Box Hill Football Club coaches
Australian rules footballers from Victoria (Australia)